A Dimond ring or Dimond ring translator was an early type of computer memory, created in the early 1940s by T. L. Dimond at Bell Laboratories for Bell's #5 Crossbar Switch, a type of early telephone switch.

Structure

Large-diameter magnetic ferrite toroidal rings with solenoid windings, through which are threaded writing and reading wires.

Uses
It was used in the #5 Crossbar Switch and TXE (prior to version 4) telephone exchanges.

See also
Core rope memory, a later development

References

Computer memory
Non-volatile memory